Mamadou Coulibaly (born 3 June 2003) is an Ivorian footballer who currently plays as a midfielder for Al Jazira.

Career statistics

Club

Notes

References

2003 births
Living people
Ivorian footballers
Association football midfielders
UAE Pro League players
Al Jazira Club players
Ivorian expatriate footballers
Ivorian expatriate sportspeople in the United Arab Emirates
Expatriate footballers in the United Arab Emirates